Several ships of the Swedish Navy have been named HSwMS Härnösand, named after the city of Härnösand:

  was a frigate launched in 1743
  was a  launched in 2004

Swedish Navy ship names